Yherland McDonald (born 6 September 1986 in Costa Rica) is a Costa Rican retired footballer.

References

Living people
Costa Rican footballers
1986 births
Association football forwards
Association football wingers
Association football midfielders
Fredrikstad FK players
Brujas FC players